Meghan Duggan (born September 3, 1987) is an American former ice hockey forward and director of player development for the New Jersey Devils of the National Hockey League. She played for the United States at the 2010 Winter Olympics and 2014 Winter Olympics, winning two silver medals; she was the captain of the U.S. team at the 2018 Winter Olympics, where she won a gold medal. She also represented the United States at eight Women's World Championships, capturing seven gold medals and one silver medal. Duggan played collegiate hockey with the Wisconsin Badgers between 2006 and 2011.  After her senior season (2010–11),  Duggan was named the winner of the Patty Kazmaier Award, presented annually to the top women's ice hockey player in the National Collegiate Athletic Association (NCAA).  After her career at Wisconsin, Duggan was the team's all-time leading scorer. She was drafted 8th overall by the Boston Blades in the 2011 CWHL Draft. 

Duggan announced her retirement from professional hockey on October 13, 2020 at age 33.

Early life
Duggan was born on September 3, 1987, in Danvers, Massachusetts. Growing up, she played ice hockey, soccer, softball, and lacrosse, but hockey was always her "number one sport". She began skating in the Danvers Youth Hockey program, and admired United States women's national ice hockey team player Gretchen Ulion. Her older brother Brian also played hockey, and Duggan often played in boys' leagues, which was the "only option" at the time.

Duggan attended high school at Cushing Academy in Ashburnham, Massachusetts, where she played on the school's girls' hockey team in the New England Preparatory School Athletic Council (NEPSAC). Her roommate was Erika Lawler, who would later become her college and Olympic teammate. While attending Cushing, Duggan met Olympian Julie Chu and other members of the USA women's national team at an informal skate in Boston. Duggan was also a three-time honoree of the Bette Davis award, given by Cushing to the best female athlete in her class.

Playing career

Wisconsin Badgers
On December 6, 2005, the University of Wisconsin announced that Duggan was one of four student-athletes who signed a National Letter of Intent, committing to joining the Wisconsin Badgers women's ice hockey program beginning in the 2006–07 season. The other three were Alannah McCready, Emily Kranz, and Kyla Sanders.

Her freshman season with the Badgers was in 2006–07. She ranked second on the team with 52 points, as she led freshmen in scoring, while scoring 26 goals. During the season, she scored three game-winning goals and recorded 16 multi-point games. In the NCAA, her 52 points were good enough for third in the nation in rookie scoring. Duggan earned three consecutive WCHA Rookie of the Week honors, becoming the first Badger to ever win a conference award in three straight weeks. In addition, she accumulated five WCHA weekly honors overall, the most by a Badgers player in a single season.

On January 22, 2011, Duggan assisted on the Badgers’ second goal of the game, against the defending national champions, the Minnesota-Duluth Bulldogs, and extended her point streak to 22 games, the longest individual point streak in Wisconsin women's hockey history.

Duggan finished the season as the WCHA scoring champion by accumulating 61 points (27 goals, 34 assists) in 28 games. On March 12, 2011, she scored the game-winning goal (it was her sixth game-winning goal of the season) in the NCAA regional playoff, as Wisconsin defeated Minnesota-Duluth by a 2–1 mark.

Professional career

Duggan played six seasons of professional hockey, including four with the Boston Blades of the Canadian Women's Hockey League (2011–15), who won the Clarkson Cup  in 2013 and 2015. In 2015 she moved to the newly formed National Women's Hockey League played one season with the Buffalo Beauts. In December 2015, it was announced that Duggan had signed a personal services agreement with Dunkin Donuts as part of the company's sponsorship deal of the NWHL. She played her final pro season with the Boston Pride for the 2016–17 season.

International play
Duggan's first International Ice Hockey Federation (IIHF) tournament with the American senior women's team was the 2007 IIHF Women's World Championship held in Manitoba, Canada.  Duggan recorded a single assist for the Americans at the tournament, as they took home the silver medal. At the 2009 tournament, the American team captured its second straight gold medal by defeating Canada in the final.  Duggan scored two goals in the tournament, finishing tenth on the American team in scoring.

Duggan was chosen to the 2010 US Olympic team.  At the Olympics, Duggan played mainly with Gigi Marvin and Natalie Darwitz. She finished the tournament with four goals, as the American team captured the silver medal. At the 2011 IIHF Women's World Championship, Meghan Duggan was among the tournament's top five scorers. Duggan was fifth with seven points (four goals, three assists).

Duggan Captained Team USA Women's hockey team in the 2014 Olympics, once again losing to Canada. On March 15, 2017, players for the U.S. women's ice hockey team, led by Duggan, announced that they would boycott the 2017 World Championship over inequitable support and conditions for women's ice hockey unless concessions were made by USA Hockey.  On March 28 USA hockey agreed to the players demands and Duggan led Team to a gold medal win at the tournament. They would finally win Olympic Gold at the 2018 Olympics, defeating Canada in a shootout, with Duggan again serving as Captain. 

Duggan announced her retirement from Professional Hockey on October 13, 2020 at age 33.

Administrative career 
On May 19, 2021, the New Jersey Devils of the National Hockey League (NHL) announced that Duggan had been appointed manager of player development, a new role within the franchise's hockey operations department. On May 31, 2022, she was promoted to director of player development.

Awards and honors
 2018 Olympic gold medalist 
 2017 IIHF Women's World Championship – 2017 IIHF Women's World Championship Won gold medal 
 2016 IIHF Women's World Championship – 2016 IIHF Women's World Championship Won gold medal 
 2015 IIHF Women's World Championship – 2015 IIHF Women's World Championship Won gold medal 
 Captain of the 2015–2017 IIHF Women's World Championship Team 2015 IIHF Women's World Championship
 2015 Boston Blades, member of Clarkson Cup Champions
 2014 Canadian Women's Hockey League All Star Game participant at Air Canada Centre
 2014 Olympic silver medalist  
 Named captain of 2014 United States Olympic team
 2013 IIHF Women's World Championship – 2013 IIHF Women's World Championship Won gold medal 
 2012 IIHF Women's World Championship –  2012 IIHF Women's World Championship Won silver medal 
 2011 IIHF Women's World Championship – 2011 IIHF Women's World Championship Won gold medal 
 2011 Graduate, University of Wisconsin (BIOLOGY)
 2011 WCHA Player of the Year
 2011 WCHA scoring champion
 2011 All-WCHA First Team
 Finalist, 2011 Sportswoman of the Year, presented by the Women's Sports Foundation
 2011 Big Ten Outstanding Sportsmanship Award
 2011 First Team All-America selection
 2011 Patty Kazmaier Memorial Award winner
 2011 Bob Allen Women's Player of the Year, awarded by USA Hockey
 2010 Olympic silver medalist  
 2009 IIHF Women's World Championship – 2009 IIHF Women's World Championship Won gold medal 
 2008 IIHF Women's World Championship –  2008 IIHF Women's World Championship Won gold medal 
 2007 IIHF Women's World Championship –  2007 IIHF Women's World Championship Won silver medal 
 2007 Graduate, Cushing Academy (Ashburnham, MA)
 Two-time member of the U.S. Women's Select Team for the Four Nations Cup (1st-2008, 2nd-2007)
 Two-time member of the U.S. Women's Under-22 Select Team for the Under-22 Series with Canada (2007–08). Co-captained the team in 2008
 Three-time USA Hockey Women's National Festival participant (2007–09)
 Three-time USA Hockey Player Development Camp attendee (2003–05).
 USCHO.com Offensive Player of the Week (Oct. 23, 2006)
 WCHA Offensive Player of the Week, (Week of January 26, 2011)
 WCHA Offensive Player of the Week (Week of February 16, 2011)

Coaching
Duggan began coaching for Clarkson University's women's ice hockey team in September 2014 while she played for the American national hockey team and the Boston Blades.

Personal life

On April 19, 2010, Duggan threw the first pitch at a Boston Red Sox game before a sellout Patriots' Day crowd of 37,609 with former teammates. On April 25, 2014, Duggan was honored to throw the first pitch at a Boston Red Sox game for a second time with her Team USA 2014 US Olympic teammates.

On September 22, 2018, she married Canadian women's hockey player Gillian Apps, whom she had played against at the 2010 and 2014 Olympics. They had their first child together, a boy named George, in February 2020. They then had their second child together, a daughter named Olivia, one year later.

Career statistics

Regular season and playoffs

International

References

External links
 
 
 Meghan Duggan at Wisconsin Badgers
 
 Meghan Duggan at USA Hockey
 
 
 

1987 births
American women's ice hockey forwards
Boston Blades players
Boston Pride players
Buffalo Beauts players
Ice hockey players from Massachusetts
Ice hockey players at the 2010 Winter Olympics
Ice hockey players at the 2014 Winter Olympics
Ice hockey players at the 2018 Winter Olympics
Living people
LGBT people from Massachusetts
American LGBT sportspeople
LGBT ice hockey players
Lesbian sportswomen
Medalists at the 2010 Winter Olympics
Medalists at the 2014 Winter Olympics
Medalists at the 2018 Winter Olympics
Premier Hockey Federation players
Olympic gold medalists for the United States in ice hockey
Olympic silver medalists for the United States in ice hockey
Patty Kazmaier Award winners
People from Danvers, Massachusetts
Sportspeople from Essex County, Massachusetts
Wisconsin Badgers women's ice hockey players